Twin Islands, or minor variations thereof, may refer to:

In Canada
 Twin Islands (British Columbia)
 Twin Islands (Nunavut)
 North Twin Island (Nunavut)
 South Twin Island (Nunavut)
Twin Islands, of Eagle Lake (Ontario)
North Twin Island (Eagle Lake)
South Twin Island (Eagle Lake)

In India *
 Twin Islands (Andaman and Nicobar Islands)

In the USA
 Twin Island, New York
 Lower Twin Island, West Virginia
 Upper Twin Island, West Virginia
 North Twin Island, Wisconsin
 South Twin Island, Wisconsin

See also
 Twin Islets, Tasmania, Australia